The Girgentana is an Italian breed of domestic goat indigenous to the province of Agrigento, in the southern part of the Mediterranean island of Sicily. There were in the past more than 30,000 head in the hills and coastal zone of the province. Today, however, this breed is in danger of disappearance.

History

The Girgentana was first described by Arturo Magliano in 1930; the origins of the breed are unknown. The animals could have been introduced to Sicily by Greek colonists about 700 BC, or in the eighth century AD by Arab invaders.  identified the Girgentana with Capra prisca and the Ram in a Thicket statues excavated at Ur by Leonard Woolley in 1927–28. Leopold Adametz proposed that it is descended, at least in part, from the markhor, Capra falconeri, a species of Central Asian goat-antelope; the horns are superficially similar, but spiral in opposite directions – the right horn of the Girgentana spirals clockwise from the base (like a corkscrew), while in the markhor it is the left.

The Girgentana is one of the eight autochthonous Italian goat breeds for which a genealogical herdbook is kept by the Associazione Nazionale della Pastorizia, the Italian national association of sheep-breeders. It was formerly numerous in the province of Agrigento, where there were more than 30,000 in the coastal area and the hilly hinterland. It has since fallen rapidly, to the point that measures for its protection may be needed. At the end of 1993 the population was estimated at 524. The conservation status of the breed was listed as "endangered" by the FAO in 2007. At the end of 2013 the registered population was 390.

Characteristics

The Girgentana goat has characteristic horns, twisted into a spiral form.  It has a long beard and a primarily white coat with grey-brown hair around the head and throat. It has a good production of high-quality milk.

References

Goat breeds
Dairy goat breeds
Goat breeds originating in Italy